Attorney General Wise may refer to:

Bernhard Wise (1858–1916), Attorney General of New South Wales
Edward Wise (judge) (1818–1865), Attorney General of New South Wales

See also
General Wise (disambiguation)